The Renewal Party of Ordino was a local political party in Ordino, Andorra.

PRO won the 1999 local elections in Ordino. Head of the list of the party, Enric Dolsa Font became mayor.

In the 2003 local elections, Enric Dolsa Font was reelected as mayor, now as a candidate of the Liberal Party of Andorra.

Defunct political parties in Andorra
Ordino